The Musita–Mayuge–Lumino–Majanji–Busia Road is a road in the Eastern Region of Uganda, connecting the town of Musita in Mayuge District to Busia in Busia District at the international border with Kenya.

Location
The road continues in an easterly direction, through Mayuge, Namayingo, and Lumino. The main road makes a northerly turn to end at the border town of Busia (2014 population 55,958). The coordinates of the road near Namayingo are 0°22'52.0"N, 33°50'09.0"E (Latitude:0.381111; Longitude:33.835833).

Overview
The road connects the districts of Mayuge, Bugiri, Namayingo, and Busia. As described, including the spur to Majanji, the entire road project measures .

Upgrading to bitumen
Before 2015, the road was unsealed gravel surface. In February 2015, the Ugandan government began the process of upgrading the road to class II bitumen surface. The first contractor for this project was the China Railway 18th Bureau Group Company, Limited (CR18), a subsidiary of the China Railway Construction Corporation. The budgeted cost of the project was UGX:207 billion. Completion of the road works was planned for August 2017.

In May 2017, the Uganda National Roads Authority (UNRA) conducted an onsite inspection and found that CR18 had completed only 12 percent of the works with only three months left until the project completion deadline. In a letter dated 12 June 2017, UNRA Executive Director Allen Kagina canceled the contract, citing CR18's alleged incompetence, performance below contractual standards, lack of commitment to the project, and failure to mobilise resources and equipment to ensure timely performance of work. She ordered the Chinese contractor to vacate the construction site immediately. UNRA plans to re-advertise the road and select a new contractor to complete the project.

A new contractor was hired, at a revised cost of USh208 billion (approx. US$55 million). The new construction company, China Railway Group Limited, scheduled completion for October 2019. The competed road was commissioned by Yoweri Museveni, the president of Uganda, in August 2021. It was reported by Construction Review Online that the construction bill was US$55 million, paid in full by the government of Uganda.

See also
 List of roads in Uganda
 Economy of Uganda
 Transport in Uganda

References

External links
 Uganda National Road Authority Homepage
 RDCs warn Chinese firm on delayed works As at 29 August 2016.

Roads in Uganda
Mayuge District
Namayingo District
Bugiri District
Busia District, Uganda
Busoga
Eastern Region, Uganda
Transport infrastructure completed in 2019
2019 establishments in Uganda